G59 or similar may refer to:
 G59 Hohhot–Beihai Expressway, China
 G59 – 1st Swiss Horticulture Exhibition
 Fiat G.59, an Italian World War II fighter aircraft
 G*59 Records, the record label of Suicideboys